Sparks is an American pop and rock duo formed by brothers Ron (keyboards) and Russell Mael (vocals) in Los Angeles. The duo is noted for their quirky approach to songwriting; their music is often accompanied by sophisticated and acerbic lyrics—often about women, and sometimes containing literary or cinematic references—and an idiosyncratic, theatrical stage presence, typified by the contrast between Russell's animated, hyperactive frontman antics and Ron's deadpan scowling. Russell Mael has a distinctive wide-ranging voice, while Ron Mael plays keyboards in an intricate and rhythmic style. 

Career highlights include "This Town Ain't Big Enough for Both of Us", which reached No. 2 on the UK Singles Chart in 1974; the disco hit "The Number One Song in Heaven" in 1979, resulting from a collaboration with Giorgio Moroder and marking a stylistic shift towards new wave/synth-pop; "When I'm With You", which made the Australian and French Singles Charts in 1980; the single "I Predict", which provided Sparks' first appearance on the Billboard Hot 100, reaching No. 60 in May 1982; the 1983 single "Cool Places" with the Go-Go's rhythm guitarist and vocalist Jane Wiedlin, and "When Do I Get to Sing 'My Way', which was the top airplay record in Germany for 1994.

Their frequently changing styles and visual presentations have kept the band at the forefront of modern, artful pop music. The 2002 release of Lil' Beethoven, the duo's self-proclaimed "genre-defining opus", fused repetitive song structures with orchestral arrangements, and brought them renewed critical success.  In 2015, the band released an album with Scottish indie rock band Franz Ferdinand, as the supergroup FFS, titled FFS. In 2017, returning to a rock-group format, Sparks released Hippopotamus, which entered the UK Albums Chart at no. 7, as did their next album, A Steady Drip, Drip, Drip, released in 2020, bringing their tally of UK Top 10 albums to four. In 2021, Sparks were involved in two films: the Leos Carax musical film Annette for which they wrote all songs (winning the César Award for Best Original Music), and the Edgar Wright documentary The Sparks Brothers recounting the history of the band. The band's latest album, The Girl Is Crying in Her Latte, is due to be released on May 26, 2023, via Island Records.

History

Inception
Brothers Ron and Russell Mael grew up in Pacific Palisades, in west Los Angeles County, California, during the "Golden Age" of the L.A. club scene, when the Doors, the Standells, and Love played the Whisky a Go Go on Sunset Strip and the Beach Boys played in the late afternoon at  Teen-Age Fair at Pickwick Recreation Center in Burbank, California.

Both Ron and Russell Mael are seen in the audience during the Ronettes' section of the concert film The Big T.N.T. Show, filmed in 1966. Both attended UCLA, Ron studying cinema and graphic art and Russell, theatre arts and filmmaking. Detesting the folk music scene, which they considered "cerebral and sedate and we had no time for that", they developed a particular taste in English bands of the time such as the Who, Syd Barrett's Pink Floyd, the Kinks and the Move, which led to their description of themselves as "Anglophiles".

Their very first recordings were made under the name of "Urban Renewal Project", on January 14, 1967, at the Fidelity Recording Studios in Hollywood. Four tracks were recorded with married couple Fred and Ronna Frank, who were close friends of the Maels at the time. Other members of the band were 16-year old drummer Raymond Clayton and 22-year old Harold Zellman on bass guitar.  Ron was considered the lead guitarist and Russell was the singer. He also played the tambourine and harmonica. The songs were pressed on two acetates and have never been released, apart from the track "Computer Girl", which was featured on a CD included with the Japanese semi-biography from 2006 and more widely released on the Past Tense greatest hits album in 2019. The other three tracks were entitled "The Windmill", "A Quick Thought" and "As You Like It". Of all four songs, "Computer Girl" was the least traditional. Russell plays pan flute on "A Quick Thought".

Forming Halfnelson, named after a wrestling hold, in 1968, they soon came to the attention of producer Todd Rundgren, at whose urging Albert Grossman signed the band to his Bearsville record label. Their debut album was released on Bearsville Records in 1971 with the line-up consisting of college friend Earle Mankey on guitar, Mankey's brother James on bass, Harley Feinstein on drums and Rundgren producing. It sold poorly. The Whole Burbank Catalog, a 1972 Warner Brothers $2, 2-LP loss leader sampler included, "Biology II". After renaming themselves Sparks in 1972, a play on the Marx Brothers, the album was then re-released by Bearsville Records in 1972 as Sparks. The re-issued debut spawned the minor regional hit "Wonder Girl".

Their follow-up album, A Woofer in Tweeter's Clothing, led to a tour of the United Kingdom, including a residency at the Marquee Club in London, These London appearances helped them to secure a significant cult following.

1973–1976: the Island Records years

Relocating to England in 1973 with a new manager, John Hewlett, founder of John's Children, and a deal from Island Records, thanks in part to the exposure garnered by their BBC Two Whistle Test performance, they placed an ad in music weekly Melody Maker ("Wanted bass player for Sparks.  Must be beard free and exciting") and through this hired Martin Gordon. With Adrian Fisher on guitar and Norman "Dinky" Diamond on drums, in the midst of power cuts and a threatened vinyl shortage, they recorded their breakthrough Kimono My House in 1974, scoring a No. 2 hit with the single "This Town Ain't Big Enough for Both of Us".

Sparks became a UK teen sensation appearing on the cover of Melody Maker, Record Mirror and countless other pop magazines in the UK and Europe. Hits such as "This Town Ain't Big Enough for Both of Us", "Amateur Hour" and "Never Turn Your Back on Mother Earth" led to many appearances on the BBC's flagship music show Top of the Pops. Russell's hyperactive movements were in sharp contrast to the keyboard-bound, soberly dressed Ron's expressionless squint and Charlie Chaplin-esque moustache.

Gordon and Fisher were later replaced by Trevor White and Ian Hampton. In 1975, the revised band returned to the US to tour supporting the Kimono and Propaganda albums which had gained strong cult attention in New York City, Cleveland, Chicago, San Francisco and Los Angeles primarily from FM radio play and a national TV appearance on Don Kirshner's Rock Concert. Flo & Eddie were the supporting act. Influential 1970s progressive FM radio station powerhouse WMMS in Cleveland and its famed DJs such as Kid Leo initially championed the band in America. Sparks also performed on American Bandstand in 1975 with host Dick Clark mugging with Ron and on countless other TV shows in the US and abroad post 1977.

The follow-up albums, Propaganda and Indiscreet, the latter produced by Tony Visconti, were similarly successful and produced the hit singles "Looks, Looks, Looks", "Never Turn Your Back on Mother Earth" and "Something for the Girl with Everything".

1976–1979: return to America and transition to synthpop
The Maels returned home to Los Angeles in 1976. Concerned that their music may have become stale, they adopted a more "American" sound and recorded Big Beat with Rupert Holmes and Jeffrey Lesser on production, which they followed with Introducing Sparks; both albums were mostly recorded with session musicians. This new "West Coast" sound yielded such songs as "Nothing to Do", "Everybody's Stupid", and "Throw Her Away (and Get a New One)". In 1976, Sparks made one of their first forays into the movie business, making a cameo appearance in the disaster-suspense film Rollercoaster, after Kiss turned down the roles. They performed the songs "Fill 'Er Up" and "Big Boy".

By 1977 the brothers found themselves at a crossroads. They had cut ties with Hewlett and had grown tired of recording within a traditional rock band framework. In a conversation with a German journalist, they expressed their admiration for Giorgio Moroder, a pioneer of electronic disco and pop music. Moroder happened to be a friend of the journalist, and he was able to connect the brothers with the Italian producer, who produced their next album, No. 1 in Heaven. More electronic and synthesizer-based than their previous efforts, the album would redefine Sparks' sound and challenge the concept of what is meant by a band, and it also became a major influence on emerging electronic pop artists. It spawned two singles in the top-fifteen UK chart: "The Number One Song in Heaven" and "Beat The Clock". The follow-up album in 1980, Terminal Jive, had a hit single in France, "When I'm With You", which led to the Maels staying in the country for a year promoting the album, during which Russell became conversationally fluent in French. The single also hit the Top 20 in Australia, reaching No.14. In 1981, Belgian synth pop group Telex enlisted Sparks to help write the lyrics for their third album, Sex.

1979–1990: the Los Angeles years

Finding the electronic equipment that they had adopted for their new sound too cumbersome for touring, the band returned to the more conventional band format for their next three releases, although they did not eschew synthesizers entirely: Whomp That Sucker, Angst in My Pants, (two tracks from which appear later in the 1983 movie Valley Girl) and In Outer Space. They broke into the US singles chart once more, reaching No. 49 with "Cool Places" from 1983's In Outer Space. The track was a collaboration with the Go-Go's rhythm guitarist and backing vocalist Jane Wiedlin (a dedicated fan of the band who at one time ran her own Sparks fan club), and its success was in part thanks to Los Angeles' KROQ-FM radio station, which hailed them as local heroes. In 1984, the Maels wrote and performed several original songs on the soundtrack for the black comedy teen film Bad Manners (aka: Growing Pains), including the film's title song, "Bad Manners". In 1989, they scored a hit single in France and in Europe with "Singing in the Shower", sung in duet with Rita Mitsouko: the single was produced by Tony Visconti.

Beginning in the late 1980s, Sparks attempted to make the Japanese manga Mai, the Psychic Girl into a musical, with interest from Tim Burton and Carolco Pictures, who purchased the film rights in August 1991. Carolco hoped Burton would start production in 1992, but he chose to work on The Nightmare Before Christmas and Ed Wood for Touchstone Pictures. The option on the film rights eventually expired, and Burton dropped out. Francis Ford Coppola later developed the property in the late 1990s. In June 2000, Sony Pictures Entertainment started on a different project with Kirk Wong attached to direct. By February 2001, a script had been written by Lisa Addario and Joey Syracuse for Sony's Columbia Pictures. The release of The Seduction of Ingmar Bergman, a radio musical by Sparks, in August 2009, was informed by the six years the band spent trying to get their Mai, the Psychic Girl produced. The album generated new interest, and gained a "second wind", vocalist Russell Mael explained. "The music is all ready and we are hoping that this still might see the light of day." On May 18, 2010, Burton expressed renewed interest in adapting the property.

1990–2002: Gratuitous Sax & Senseless Violins and Balls
In 1993, Ron and Russell returned with the non-album single "National Crime Awareness Week", their first release since the 1988 album Interior Design. The song was produced by the Scottish dance band Finitribe. In 1994, the Maels released Gratuitous Sax & Senseless Violins, providing the hit singles "When Do I Get to Sing 'My Way' and "When I Kiss You (I Hear Charlie Parker Playing)". In Germany, "When Do I Get to Sing 'My Way was the No. 1 airplay song for 1994 as well as being hailed critically for its poignant lyrics and touching melody. The band toured in support of the album with percussionist Christi Haydon playing drums. Haydon also appeared in the videos for "When Do I Get to Sing 'My Way'" and "When I Kiss You (I Hear Charlie Parker Playing)", which were both directed by Sophie Muller.

1997 saw the release of Plagiarism, an album of cover versions of their own songs featuring collaborations with Faith No More, Erasure and Jimmy Somerville. Half of the album was recorded by Tony Visconti in London with the other half recorded by the brothers in their own purpose-built studio in LA, surrounded by busts of Elvis. In 1998 they recorded the soundtrack for the action film Knock Off, starring Jean-Claude Van Damme, directed by the acclaimed Hong Kong-based producer/director Tsui Hark (who had appeared on his own tribute song by the band on the album Gratuitous Sax and Senseless Violins).

Balls, released in 2000, again put the band in a context of electronic instrumentation with some of Ron's most striking and perceptive lyrics. With the release of Balls the band toured the UK, Germany, Japan and Australia.

2002–2009: Lil' Beethoven, Hello Young Lovers and Exotic Creatures of the Deep
After Balls, the band resurfaced in 2002 with the release of an album described of what they called their "genre-defining opus" – Lil' Beethoven, featuring quasi-classical arrangements of strings and choirs. Lil' Beethoven led to renewed interest in the band. Record Collector magazine named the album as one of its "Best New Albums of 2002", describing it as "...possibly the most exciting and interesting release ever from such a long-established act" and later in 2003 saying "...it really does feel like one of the best albums ever made." A UK and European tour had the band playing the entire album each night in the first half of the show, with fan favourites making up the second. The line-up now included former Faith No More guitarist Dean Menta in addition to Tammy Glover on drums. Long-time fan Morrissey invited Sparks to perform at the 2004 Meltdown Festival, of which he was curator. They performed their breakthrough Kimono My House album, followed by Lil Beethoven, both in their entirety. Also in this period, the duo appeared in the music video for the Darkness' Justin Hawkins's cover of "This Town Ain't Big Enough for Both of Us", in which Ron and Russell play the referee and MC at a darts match between Hawkins and darts champion Phil Taylor. This version of "This Town" reached No.6 in the UK charts. Sparks would later release Lil' Beethovens closing track "Suburban Homeboy" as a single.

February 2006 saw the release of Hello Young Lovers, their twentieth studio album. The album is regarded as carrying on where Lil' Beethoven left off, being described as "...cynical, intelligent and very, very funny", it has met with considerable acclaim. Sparks led off the album with the striking tune that the BBC deemed too provocative in its title to play, "Dick Around". The song is a multi-section, multi-mood, highly layered track that many felt should have been a UK smash hit had the BBC not misinterpreted the title of the song as being other than it was.

The brothers tend to be dismissive of the latest trends in popular music, seeing most current bands as lacking musical ambition and experimental drive. Indeed, the predictable trends in much of modern rock, as they see it, served as inspiration for their latest album. However, they have expressed admiration for Eminem and Morrissey.

The pair appeared in the season 6 finale of the US TV show Gilmore Girls, performing "Perfume" from the album Hello Young Lovers. They released a live DVD of a September 2006 show at The Forum as well as a long-awaited CD release of their previously unavailable 1977 album Introducing Sparks. The track "Perfume" was featured in a Dolce & Gabbana TV commercial in 2009.

On May 12, 2008, Sparks released the single "Good Morning", taken from the album Exotic Creatures of the Deep.

May and June 2008 saw the 21-night "Sparks Spectacular" in London, where they played each of their albums in chronological order during the first twenty nights and premiered their new album on the twenty-first concert on June 13, 2008. Each night, they performed an album in its entirety followed by a rare track– many of the songs had never been performed live before. The band asked their fans to visit their website and vote for the track that they'd most like to hear the band perform during the second half of the 21st concert after the premiere of Exotic Creatures of the Deep, though Russell admitted that he and Ron would probably influence the poll a little.

Fans who bought a "Golden Ticket" (which allowed entry into all 21 gigs) also received a poster signed by the band and a CD single entitled "Islington N1", a reference to the postal address of the venue for the first 20 gigs. The song "Islington N1" was later made available in the box set edition of their "New Music For Amnesiacs" career-spanning box set.

In 2009 the band played two consecutive nights at The Forum on 20 and 21 March. They played Exotic Creatures of the Deep in its entirety at both gigs, followed by Kimono My House in its entirety on the first night and No.1 in Heaven in its entirety on the second night.

Valentine's Day evening 2009 saw Sparks perform the same show featuring their Exotic Creatures of the Deep and Kimono My House albums played in their entirety before a sold-out hometown crowd at Royce Hall at the Mael Bros. alma mater in Los Angeles, UCLA.

Ron and Russell appeared as interview subjects in the 2009 documentary The Magnificent Tati, discussing their involvement during the early 1980s in Confusion, a proposed Jacques Tati movie for which a screenplay was written but never shot (due to Tati's death).

2009: The Seduction of Ingmar Bergman

The band premiered the radio musical The Seduction of Ingmar Bergman, in August 2009. Commissioned by the Swedish public radio (SR) it featured the Mael brothers themselves along with Swedish actors Elin Klinga and Jonas Malmsjö, both of whom worked with Bergman in his lifetime. The musical, partly in English, partly in Swedish, tells the story of Bergman's relocation to Hollywood after his breakthrough with Smiles of a Summer Night (1956), and the surreal and discomforting encounter with the movie capital. The UK's BBC Radio 6 Music held a similar event in London two months later whereby the musical was played in its entirety before a live audience at the BBC Broadcasting House in London and later to be broadcast with a Q&A with the Maels.

In June 2011, as part of the Los Angeles Film Festival, Sparks presented the World Premiere live performance of The Seduction of Ingmar Bergman at the John Anson Ford Amphitheatre in Hollywood. Canadian film director Guy Maddin provided directions based on the screenplay, with Ron and Russell reprising their recorded roles on stage. The role of Ingmar Bergman was performed by Finnish movie actor Peter Franzén and American actress Ann Magnuson portrayed the role of Greta Garbo.  The group showcased at the film festival in an attempt to raise funding for a feature film version. The performance garnered glowing reviews from journals such as The Huffington Post, the LA Times, the LA Weekly, and LA Record.

Since 2011, the band have been pursuing the idea of turning The Seduction of Ingmar Bergman into a feature film. Originally envisaged as a live-action film, in 2017, the Mael Brothers announced they were taking a new direction and developing Bergman as an animated feature film with director Joseph Wallace, who created the music video for their track "Edith Piaf (Said It Better Than Me)". As of 2022 no film version of the musical has been made.

2010–2019: FFS and Hippopotamus
In 2010, Sparks remixed Yoko Ono's song "Give Me Something". In July they contributed a remix of sorts to singer Katie Melua's single, A Happy Place, calling it Sparks VS. Melua. September 2 marked the debut of the new theme songs that Ron and Russell had composed and recorded for NPR radio's Bookworm show, broadcast in Los Angeles on station KCRW. The two songs, titled "Where Would We Be Without Books?" and "I Am A Bookworm", were commissioned by show host and Sparks fan Michael Silverblatt as the first new theme songs for the programme in 21 years.

For the encore of what may have been the final live date ever in America for Faith No More on December 1 at the Hollywood Palladium in Los Angeles, Ron and Russell Mael were invited by Mike Patton and Co. to perform the Sparks' classic hit "This Town Ain't Big Enough for Both of Us". They reprised the song that also appears as a collaboration with Faith No More on Sparks' 1997 album Plagiarism and had also been released as a single.

In 2012 Ron and Russell collaborated with singer Gemma Ray who released a limited 12-inch single titled "Gemma Ray Sings Sparks (with Sparks)", which included Ray's covers of Sparks' "How Do I Get To Carnegie Hall" and "Eaten by the Monster of Love". In October, Ron and Russell performed for the first time ever as a duo, with no band. The 18-city European tour titled "Two Hands One Mouth" began in Lithuania and followed in Latvia, Finland, Norway, Sweden, Germany, Belgium, Ireland and finished with a sold-out show at the Barbican Centre in London. The tour then took the group to Japan and the US, including two performances at the Coachella Festival, with a show in Paris following in 2013 where they were joined on stage by Catherine Ringer from Les Rita Mitsouko to sing on their 1989 collaboration "Singing in The Shower". Recordings from the tour resulted in Sparks first live album, Two Hands, One Mouth: Live in Europe, which was released later in 2013. Ron and Russell continued touring in the duo format for a second round, titling the tour "The Revenge of Two Hands One Mouth", taking in dates in both North America and Europe, including Fun Fun Fun Fest in Austin, Texas, and three nights at Union Chapel in London, where Thurston Moore joined them to play guitar on "This Town Ain't Big Enough for Both of Us". Both "Two Hands One Mouth" and "The Revenge of Two Hands One Mouth" tours were critically well received. In 2013 they contributed a song and brief voice part to the Guy Maddin movie The Forbidden Room.

2014 marked the 40th Anniversary of Kimono My House. The landmark was celebrated with a performance the album in its entirety, along with a greatest hits set, at the Barbican Centre in London on 19 and 20 December with backing from the 35-piece Heritage Orchestra. Ron and Russell took the Kimono My House celebrations to Los Angeles as they performed the album on two consecutive nights with a 38-piece orchestra at the United Artists Theatre at Ace Hotel Los Angeles on 14 and 15 February 2015. Both shows sold out and they received glowing reviews. Alex Kapranos of Franz Ferdinand joined them on stage for duet with Russell on the song "When Do I Get to Sing 'My Way on both nights.

Before Kapranos's appearance in Los Angeles, Sparks and Franz Ferdinand had been collaborating and in late 2014 had recorded an album together, produced by John Congleton. The supergroup, named FFS, was unveiled in March 2015 with a short teaser video of song "The Power Couple". An eponymous album was released in June 2015. The album was promoted with appearances on BBC programme Later with Jools Holland, and the Glastonbury Festival.

Sparks's 23rd studio album, Hippopotamus, was released in September 2017 to critical and commercial success, peaking at number 7 in the UK Albums Chart. A full band tour, starting in Copenhagen, was undertaken to support the record. In 2019, Sparks collaborated with and were featured on French artist Sebastian's album, Thirst on the track, "Handcuffed to a Parking Meter".

2020s: A Steady Drip, Drip, Drip, Annette and The Girl Is Crying in Her Latte
The band's first album of the 2020s, A Steady Drip, Drip, Drip, was released in digital form in May 2020, with the physical release pushed back to July  due to the COVID-19 pandemic. The album was preceded by singles "Self-Effacing", and "I'm Toast" in February and March, respectively. Like its predecessor, Hippopotamus, it entered the UK Albums Chart at number 7 and garnered universal critical acclaim. Coinciding with the physical release of the album, an official music video for the song "The Existential Threat" premiered on YouTube, the animation created by English freelance animator and composer Cyriak Harris. The band then collaborated with Todd Rundgren on the single "Your Fandango", 50 years after he produced their debut album.

Sparks were involved in two 2021 film releases, as screenwriters and composers for the musical Annette, directed by Leos Carax and starring Adam Driver and Marion Cotillard, and in The Sparks Brothers, a documentary about their career directed by Edgar Wright. Annette premiered at the 2021 Cannes Film Festival and was in competition for the Palme d'Or. The leading track "So May We Start" was accompanied by a video featuring the band with Driver and Cotillard, and the Annette soundtrack was released on Sony.

In February 2022 Sparks played two sold-out shows at the Walt Disney Concert Hall, their first full concerts since 2018 following postponements of tour dates throughout 2020 and 2021. Variety lauded the first concert as "a rousingly celebratory homecoming". North American and European spring tours followed, then festival dates in the US and Japan. The Maels performed at the 2022 Césars, France's national film award ceremony, and received a César for best original music for Annette.

In November 2022, Focus Features announced they would be producing a new musical titled 'X Crucior' to be written and produced by the Mael brothers. Their next studio album, titled The Girl Is Crying in Her Latte, and a world tour were confirmed for 2023. Sparks re-signed to Island Records in January 2023. The band's lead off single, "The Girl Is Crying in Her Latte", features a music video released on March 3 with actress Cate Blanchett dancing to the song.

Style
Sparks is regarded as an art pop band.
Their musical style has varied dramatically with Russell Mael's distinctive wide-ranging voice (in particular his far-reaching falsetto) and Ron Mael's intricate and rhythmic keyboard playing style being the common thread throughout their fifty-year career. In its review of Kimono My House, NME described Russell's falsetto as a "stratospheric blend of Marc Bolan and Tiny Tim". In the beginning, they attempted to emulate the sound of their English idols, such as the Who, Syd Barrett-era Pink Floyd and the Kinks, sometimes even pretending to be an English band while on the LA club circuit. They relocated to England during the glam rock era where, despite cutting an odd figure on this scene, they found success with their polished brand of intricate pop tunes and convoluted lyrics. Early albums such as Kimono My House combined glam rock with elements of bubblegum pop and baroque music. By the second half of the decade, they were concerned that the sound they had developed while based in England was in danger of becoming stale; they returned to LA, determined to adopt a more "West Coast" sound. This they achieved with producer Rupert Holmes on Big Beat and (sans Holmes) on Introducing Sparks.

The band were not satisfied with the results, which they felt lacked personality, perhaps because of the reliance on session musicians. This led to the most dramatic change of style the band would attempt, when they teamed up with Giorgio Moroder, dropped the rock-group format altogether and produced the disco record No.1 in Heaven which relied on synthesizers. This album is regarded as a landmark in the development of electronic music and greatly influenced bands which would emerge in the following years. They soon returned to a more traditional line-up, which remained until 1988's Interior Design. There then followed a long hiatus until 1994's Gratuitous Sax & Senseless Violins, which was a foray into the techno dance world, which they had helped to spawn back in the late 1970s.

In 2002, the band switched to a classically influenced art pop style with the release of their album Lil' Beethoven, replacing the beat-driven synth-pop of their previous albums with complex orchestral arrangements. The band acknowledged this change in style on the album's opening track "The Rhythm Thief".

Lyrically, the band's style has been described as coming from "the school of Cole Porter, favouring caustic wit over trivial personal problems,... achingly clever lyrics seesaw between superficial gloss, profound sentiment and the incomprehensibly bizarre". Repeated lyrical motifs have become a distinct feature on recent albums. On "My Baby's Taking Me Home" of Lil' Beethoven (2002), the song title is repeated 104 times, with no other words being used, other than a spoken interlude. Similarly, on the same album, "Your Call Is Very Important To Us", uses a corporation style call-hold message: "Your call is very important to us.  Please hold" which is then sung with some additional words: "At first she said your call is very important to us, then she said please, please hold." The only other lyrics in the song are "Red light", "Green light", "I'm Getting Mixed Signals" and "Sorry, I'm Going To Have To Put You Back On Hold". These elements are layered with a simple piano line to create a highly textured effect.

The vocal sound on the single "This Town Ain't Big Enough for Both of Us" was criticised as being "stylised". This may be because the song was written without any regard for the vocal style of Russell Mael. Ron Mael has explained:

"This Town Ain't Big Enough for Both of Us" was written in A, and by God, it'll be sung in A. I just feel that if you're coming up with most of the music, then you have an idea where it's going to go. And no singer is gonna get in my way.

Russell Mael has claimed in reply:

When he wrote "This Town Ain't Big Enough for Both of Us", Ron could only play it in that key. It was so much work to transpose the song and one of us had to budge, so I made the adjustment to fit in. My voice ain't a "rock" voice. It's not soulful, in the traditional rock way; It's not about "guts". It's untrained, unschooled, I never questioned why I was singing high. It just happened, dictated by the songs. Ron has always written Sparks' lyrics and never transposed them into a rock key for me to sing. He always packed each line with words and I had to sing them as they were.

Legacy
Sparks has influenced many later genres including synth-pop, new wave, post-punk, and alternative rock, influencing a wide range of singers and bands including  Joy Division, New Order, Depeche Mode, The Smiths, Siouxsie and the Banshees, Sonic Youth and Björk.

Steve Jones of the Sex Pistols said that he constantly listened to Kimono My House back in 1974 at Paul Cook's room. "We'd sit in his bedroom for hours listening to them".  Joy Division cited "Number One Song in Heaven" as a primary influence during the recording of "Love Will Tear Us Apart". Joy Division's drummer Stephen Morris stated: "When we were doing 'Love Will Tear Us Apart', there were two records we were into: Frank Sinatra's Greatest Hits and Number One Song in Heaven by Sparks. That was the beginning of getting interested in Giorgio Moroder". Peter Hook of New Order cited Moroder's production on "The Number One Song in Heaven" as a major influence when his band changed musical style to produce electro/dance-rock songs like "Temptation" in 1982. New Order also delivered an extended live version of "When I'm With You" that same year in Milano. When they started playing music, singer Dave Gahan and composer Martin Gore of Depeche Mode cited them as one of their favorite bands. Gore also later covered "Never Turn Your Back on Mother Earth" on his Counterfeit e.p. in 1989. Other early electronic acts like the Human League, and Erasure, also mentioned the group. Nick Rhodes of Duran Duran stated about "This Town ain't...": "There was something about them that was very different. I was immediately fascinated with that song."

Sparks have also been name-checked by indie pop band the Smiths. Their singer Morrissey named Kimono My House as one of "his favourite LPs of all time". Smiths' guitarist and composer Johnny Marr said : "There's nothing better than commerciality crossed with an interesting mind" and named "This Town Ain’t Big Enough for the Both of Us" as an instance, qualifying it as one of these "Trojan singles". Siouxsie and the Banshees recorded a version of the first Sparks' success as the opening song of their covers album Through the Looking Glass. Thurston Moore of Sonic Youth also included the Sparks' song "Equator" in his list of all-time favorite songs. Joey Ramone also mentioned his liking for their records, as did later the group They Might Be Giants. Devo's singer Mark Mothersbaugh described himself as a big "Ron Mael fan" and of his look: "it was so not rock n' roll, in an unexpected way, that you just couldn't help but think that there was something there". He also listened to Kimono my House during his formative years.

Björk talked about Kimono my House as one of the records that changed her life. "[Sparks] were exotic [...], [they] were the most refreshing thing in my life" when she was eight. "I loved the way Russell Mael sung like a geisha, and that they were into wearing geisha clothes, as I was really into Japanese people". Faith No More also mentioned the group and their performances. Their keyboard player Roddy Bottum said: "I saw Sparks play on American Bandstand in 1975. My sister and I went out and immediately bought Indiscreet. In 2004, Franz Ferdinand singer Alex Kapranos published an article in the NME titled,  "why I love the Sparks". He said about their music: "It's only after a few listens you really can get into it [...] Then you really fall in love and bands change your life. Now I can't imagine life without them." John Frusciante of Red Hot Chili Peppers said that he used to listen to Kimono My House and Propaganda for Adrian Fisher's guitar playing adding, "I'm sure that it is Ron Mael who told him what to play".

Other notable acts that have mentioned Sparks include Ween, Will Sheff of Okkervil River, Mark Burgess of the Chameleons, and Cait Brennan.  Electronic band Justice hailed the group saying: "this is [...] something we like in music, this kind of epic feeling, [...] and we were really inspired by bands like Sparks [...] who have this really operatic sound". In 2012, synth-pop duo Spray released the song "Sparks Called and They Want Their Ideas Back".

In 1980 Paul McCartney also gave a nod to the band in the music video for "Coming Up" in which he appeared mimicking Ron Mael on keyboards.

Members

Current members
 Russell Mael – vocals 
 Ron Mael – keyboards 

Current supporting musicians
 Steven Nistor – drums 
 Evan Weiss – guitars, background vocals 
 Eli Pearl – guitars, background vocals 
 Patrick Kelly – bass, background vocals 
 Alex Casnoff – keyboards, background vocals 
 Tyler Parkford – keyboards, background vocals 
 Max Whipple – bass, background vocals  

Former members and supporting musicians
 Earle Mankey – guitar, vocals, background vocals 
 Jim Mankey – bass 
 Harley Feinstein – drums 
 Martin Gordon – bass 
 Adrian Fisher – guitar 
 Norman "Dinky" Diamond – drums, percussion 
 Trevor White – guitar 
 Ian Hampton – bass 
 Sal Maida – bass 
 Jeffrey Salen – guitar, background vocals 
 Hilly Boy Michaels – drums 
 Leslie Bohem – bass, background vocals 
 Bob Haag – guitar, background vocals 
 David Kendrick – drums 
 James Goodwin – synthesizers 
 Christi Haydon – drums, background vocals 
 Tammy Glover – drums, background vocals 
 Dean Menta – guitar 
 Jim Wilson – guitar, background vocals 
 Steven Shane McDonald – bass, background vocals 
 Marcus Blake – bass, guitar, background vocals

Timeline

Awards and nominations
{| class="wikitable sortable plainrowheaders" 
|-
! scope="col" | Award
! scope="col" | Year
! scope="col" | Nominee(s)
! scope="col" | Category
! scope="col" | Result
! scope="col" class="unsortable"| 
|-
!scope="row"|Cannes Soundtrack Award
| 2021
| rowspan=4|Annette
| Best Composer
| 
| 
|-
!scope="row"|Florida Film Critics Circle
| 2021
| Best Score
| 
| 
|-
!scope="row"|César Awards
| 2022
| Best Original Music
| 
| 
|-
!scope="row"|Lumières Awards
| 2022
| Best Music
| 
| 
|-
!scope="row"|NME Awards
| 2022
| The Sparks Brothers
| Best Music Film
| 
|

Discography

Studio albums

 Halfnelson (1971, reissued as Sparks, 1972)
 A Woofer in Tweeter's Clothing (1973)
 Kimono My House (1974)
 Propaganda (1974)
 Indiscreet (1975)
 Big Beat (1976)
 Introducing Sparks (1977)
 Nº 1 in Heaven (1979)
 Terminal Jive (1980)
 Whomp That Sucker (1981)
 Angst in My Pants (1982)
 In Outer Space (1983)
 Pulling Rabbits Out of a Hat (1984)
 Music That You Can Dance To (1986)
 Interior Design (1988)
 Gratuitous Sax & Senseless Violins (1994)
 Plagiarism (1997)
 Balls (2000)
 Lil' Beethoven (2002)
 Hello Young Lovers (2006)
 Exotic Creatures of the Deep (2008)
 The Seduction of Ingmar Bergman (2009)
 Hippopotamus (2017)
 A Steady Drip, Drip, Drip (2020)
 The Girl Is Crying in Her Latte (upcoming, 2023)

Live albums
 Two Hands, One Mouth: Live in Europe (2012)

Collaborative albums
 FFS (2015) (with Franz Ferdinand as FFS)

Soundtracks
 Annette (2021)
 The Sparks Brothers (2022)

References

Further reading

External links

 
 
 

1972 establishments in California
American glam rock musical groups
Island Records artists
Musical groups established in 1972
Musical groups from Los Angeles
Sibling musical duos
Art pop musicians
American synth-pop groups
Synth-pop new wave musical groups
Columbia Records artists
Virgin Records artists
Elektra Records artists
Gut Records artists
Bertelsmann Music Group artists
RCA Records artists
Atlantic Records artists
Bearsville Records artists
In the Red artists
American expatriates in the United Kingdom
American expatriates in France